Orhan Ölmez (born May 1, 1978) is a Turkish singer, composer, and songwriter.

Biography 
He was born in Manavgat, a town of Antalya, on May 1, 1978. His paternal relatives are from Divriği, Sivas. His maternal relatives are from Turgutlu, Manisa. He lived in İzmir for 15 years. He discovered his interest in music when he was introduced to the saz in 1986 and 1987. He was interested in western music and established the base of his current music during his high school years. He completed high school in İzmir. He attended state Turkish Music in The Turk Music Conservatory of Aegean University. He worked as a saz player in The Turkish Folk Music sect for one year for İzmir Radio. Later, he started his professional art life by working as composer and arranger in İstanbul and İzmir. In 2003, he came out with his first cassette called Su Misali on which he tried hard, and he ranged high and rose to fame in music industry. In 2005, he had his second album called Herşeyin Farkındayım and became more successful. In 2006, he was elected as the Best Male Fantasy Music Performer of the Year in the Kral TV music awards contests held by Kral TV. During the Ramadan of 2006, He prepared and presented Iftar and Suhur programs.

Albums 
 Su Misali (2003) 
 Her Şeyin Farkındayım (2005) 
 Damla Damla (2008) 
 Orhan Ölmez (2011) 
 2+20 (2012) 
 Türkü (2014)  
 Ya Olmasaydın (2015)
 Adam ve Kadın (2016)

Music videos 
Su Misali (2003) 
 1. Su Misali
 2. İzin Verme
 3. Özledim

Herşeyin Farkındayım (2005) 
 4. Bana Bırak
 5. Aşk Beni Sevmedi
 6. Bensiz Aşka Doyma
 7. Sabır Lazım
 8. Yalvarayım mı

Damla Damla (2008)
 9. Damla Damla
 10. Iki Elin Kanda Olsa Da Gel
 11. Yani Olmuyor
 12. Yasa Dışı

Orhan Ölmez (2011)
 13. Bilmece
 14. Senden Vazgeçtim
 15. Nezaket

References

External links 
 Orhan Ölmez Website
 Su Misali cultural, musical and art E-Review (01.10.2007)
 Orhan Ölmez Video Archive YouTube
 Orhan Ölmez Video Archive Dailymotion

1978 births
People from Antalya
Turkish folk-pop singers
Turkish pop singers
Turkish singer-songwriters
Living people
21st-century Turkish singers
21st-century Turkish male singers